Jahnke is a German surname meaning "kin of John" or "kin of Johann". The name likely originated in northeast Germany, possibly Pomerania. Notable people with the surname include:
Eugene (Eugen) Jahnke (1863-1921), mathematician, author "Tables of functions with formulae and curves" with Fritz Emde
Gerburg Jahnke (born 1955), German comedian
Hugo Jahnke (1886–1939), Swedish gymnast
Kurt Jahnke (1882–1945), German-American intelligence agent and saboteur 
Ryan Jahnke (born 1978), American figure skater

See also
 Jahnke, Richmond, Virginia, a neighborhood in Richmond, Virginia, United States

German-language surnames